Covelo may refer to the following places:

in the United States:
 Covelo, California— a census-designated place in California, USA
 Covelo AVA, California wine region in Mendocino County
in Portugal:
 Covelo (Gondomar)— a civic parish (freguesia) in the municipality of Gondomar, Portugal
 Covelo (Tábua)— a civic parish (freguesia) in the municipality of Tábua, Portugal
 Covelo do Gerês— a civic parish (freguesia) in the municipality of Montalegre, Portugal
in Spain:
 Covelo, Galicia— a municipality (concello) in the province of Pontevedra, Galicia, Spain.
 Covelo, medieval name for Cubelo de Sanabria